Patrick Murray (born 1956 or 1957) is an English actor who had roles in ITV Playhouse (1977), Scum and Quadrophenia (1979), Breaking Glass (1980), Curse of the Pink Panther (1983), Bergerac (1983), Dempsey and Makepeace (1986), The Firm (1989). He was most notable for his role as Mickey Pearce in 20 episodes of Only Fools and Horses from 1983 to 2003.

Early Life and career
In 1977, Murray appeared in television play Scum, and again In the 1979 film of the same name Scum, both times alongside Ray Winstone. He also starred in the 1979 film Quadrophenia, in a cast which included Sting, Toyah Willcox, Michael Elphick and Timothy Spall. In 1989, he starred in the film The Firm alongside Gary Oldman.

Murray's longest role was as Mickey Pearce in 20 episodes of Only Fools and Horses between 1983-2003, starring alongside David Jason and Nicholas Lyndhurst.

Personal life
In 2018, Murray was supposed to take part in a bus trip that would raise money for Demelza, a children's hospice. However, the trip was called off last minute as Murray revealed he is receiving treatment for chronic obstructive pulmonary disease. The trip included him entertaining 70 fans while travelling from Leysdown-on-Sea in Kent to Margate. Murray wanted to complete the trip at a later date.

Murray had retired from acting and became a cab driver, in order to comply with minimum income rules for non-European spouses to bring his wife Anong, and daughter Josie, over from Thailand. A rule purportedly introduced by Theresa May in 2012, during her time as Home Secretary. Since that time, Murray and Anong have managed to obtain a VISA. 

In May 2022, Murray announced that he had been given the all-clear on his lung cancer and treatment had been successful. He had had the medical procedure Transcatheter arterial chemoembolization (TACE).

Filmography

Television

References

External links
 

Living people
1950s births
British male comedy actors
English male film actors
English male television actors
Year of birth missing (living people)
Place of birth missing (living people)